The Seychelles National Party (SNP) is a liberal political party in Seychelles. Its followers emphasize active multiparty democracy, respect for human rights and liberal economic reforms. It was founded in response to what it called the "totalitarian regime" of former President France-Albert René. It publishes a newsletter called Regar, which is frequently sued for libel by government officials. On Regar's front page of every issue is a quote from the constitution of Seychelles invoking their right to freedom of speech and freedom of expression.

The SNP was formed by the merger of three separate opposition parties in 1994: the Seychelles National Movement, led by Gérard Hoarau; the National Alliance Party, led by Philippe Boullé (an independent presidential candidate in the 2001 presidential election); and Parti Seselwa, led by Wavel Ramkalawan.

Ramkalawan, an Anglican priest, is the SNP's current leader. He won 44.9% of the vote in the 2001 presidential election, behind René (54.2%) and ahead of Boullé (0.9%). At parliamentary elections in December 2002, the SNP won 42.6% of the vote and 11 seats out of 34. Seven members were directly elected and four were chosen by proportional representation.

The July/August 2006 presidential elections gave James Michel of the SPPF 54% of the votes and Wavel Ramkalawan 46% of the votes. The last Presidential elections  held in December 2015 saw SNP achieving only 35% of the popular votes in the first round. It joined with other smaller political parties under the banner of Union for Change to contest the second round of the Presidential Elections. The Union achieved 49.85% of the popular votes leaving the incumbent President James Michel to claim a slim victory.

The election of the National Assembly was held on the 22–24 October 2020. The Seychelles National Party, the Seychelles Party for Social Justice and Democracy and the Seychelles United Party formed a coalition, Linyon Demokratik Seselwa (LDS). LDS won 25 seats and US got 10 seats of the 35 seats of the National Assembly. In the simultaneous presidential election  Wavel Ramkalawan won and he was the first president since 1977 who did not represent the long-term ruling party.

Electoral history

Presidential elections

National Assembly elections

Notable people 
Norbert Loizeau
Satya Naidu

See also 

Liberalism
Contributions to liberal theory
Liberalism worldwide
List of liberal parties
Liberal democracy

References

External links
Seychelles National Party official site
Regar SNP supporting newspaper (currently free)

Political parties established in 1994
Liberal parties in Africa
Centrist parties in Africa
Political parties in Seychelles
Main
1994 establishments in Seychelles